Yaza Dewi Mwei Ohn-Naung was the chief queen consort of King Razadarit of Hanthawaddy Pegu from 1392 to 1421.

Brief
According to the Razadarit Ayedawbon chronicle, the queen was the eldest daughter of Saw Ye-Bein, a senior minister at the Hanthawaddy court. Her personal name was Mwei Ohn-Naung (မွေ့ အုန်နောင်). She had two younger sisters, Mwei Auk and Mi U-Si In April 1392, she was raised as the chief queen of King Razadarit, with the title of Yaza Dewi. Her two sisters were also raised as queens at the same ceremony.

She and her sisters were first cousins once removed of the king. Their father was a first cousin of Razadarit. Their paternal grandfather Binnya Thein was a noble from Chiang Mai who after a disagreement with the king of Chiang Mai had sought refuge at the court of King Binnya U. Their paternal grandmother was Tala Saw Lun, a daughter of King Saw Zein.

Ancestry

Notes

References

Bibliography
 

Chief queens consort of Hanthawaddy
14th-century Burmese women
15th-century Burmese women